Apal is a small-scale automobile company originally from Belgium.

Phase 1 -APAL - s.à.r.l. Application Polyester Armé de Liège  (1961–1998)

Glass-fibre specialist Edmond Pery founded this small automobile manufacturing company in Blegny-Trembleur, Liège Province, Belgium in 1961. Pery presented his first model, a GT coupé with gull-wing doors, propelled by Volkswagen or Porsche engines at the Brussels Autosalon (or Salon auto de Bruxelles) in 1962.

In 1965, Apal started producing a Formule V single-seater. The Apal Horizon GT was a mid-engined sports car and was made in a limited number in 1968 and 1969.

Between 1968 and 1981, about 5,000 glass-fibre bodies were produced for different buggy models such as Apal Buggy, Apal Rancho, Apal Jet, Apal Auki, and the Apal Corsa (a sporty version with gull-wing doors). The Jet was a copy of a buggy originally developed by Glassco Inc. of USA. This set of molds then made its way to England, where PABC/Eresbug built it in London, with the Four Seasons Buggy Company manufacturing it from 1971 on and finally GP Projects from 1975 until 1976. Apal traded the Auki buggy molds for the Jet molds and modified them, adding a T-bar and side skirts and replacing the curved Ford Anglia windshield (not as easy to acquire in continental Europe) with a flat unit.

The Apal 1200 Saloon was an attractive car based on Volkswagen beetle floorplan. It had a thrust-forward nose with a divided front bumper and a well-sloped curved one-piece windshield. The rear-mounted engine was air-cooled, with cooling air exhausting through a grille in the rounded tail, which also sported a divided rear bumper.

The company's most successful model was called the Apal Speedster and is a replica of the Porsche 356 Speedster, built on a VW Beetle floorplan. Altogether 700 were completed between 1981 and 1994.

In 1984 Apal also developed a two-seater sports coupé using Mercedes-Benz W201 underpinnings, called the Francorchamps after the Belgian racetrack. This was developed together with an American company with the aim of selling the car in the United States, but with the dollar rapidly losing value the project became untenable and only two copies were built. The company's last model, named the Apal Sport One, based on the Pontiac Fiero, appeared in 1992.

Edmond Pery also designed an all-road prototype for DAF in 1974 and another prototype for Volkswagen in 1992. The small firm produced and sold all models in limited numbers.

Specifications of 1966 Model Apal 1200 Saloon
Engine: four-cylinder air-cooled VW, 1192 cc, 7.0 compression ratio, rated at 40 PS
Maximum speed: 80 mph (129 km/h)
Overall length: 
Overall width:  
Height:         
Turning circle: 
Wheelbase:      
Front track:    
Rear track:     
Fuel tank capacity: 
Empty weight:

Phase 2 - Apal Gmbh, Germany (1998- to date)
The original Belgian company closed in 1998. A German company, under the name Apal Gmbh and based in Ostercappeln (Lower Saxony), bought all the spare parts and restarted production of the Apal Speedster.

As of 2006 the company has stopped production of ready-built cars and only sold kits and spare parts.

As of 2017, the Apal Automobiles brand is the exclusive propriety of Belgian businessman Charles-Antoine Masquelin.

References

External links
https://web.archive.org/web/20040810065559/http://www.rvccb.be/LISTE%20CONSTR.%20BELGES/A.html#apal
https://web.archive.org/web/20040728093255/http://www.apal.de/
Apal Club Belgium

Car manufacturers of Belgium
Car manufacturers of Germany
Kit car manufacturers
Companies based in Liège Province
Companies based in Lower Saxony
1960s cars